Tomasz Wicherkiewicz (born 1967) is a Polish linguist who is Professor of Linguistics and Chair at Adam Mickiewicz University in Poznań.

Publications in English
 "Endangered languages. In Search of a Comprehensive Model for Research and Revitalization" (z Justyną Olko), in: Integral strategies for language revitalization, ed. J. Olko, T. Wicherkiewicz, R. Borges, Wydział AL, Uniwersytet Warszawski, Warszawa 2016, p. 653-680.
 The Ukrainian & Ruthenian languages in education in Poland, Mercator-Education Regional Dossiers, Fryske Akademy, Ljouwert, 2006.
 The Lithuanian language in education in Poland, Mercator-Education Regional Dossiers, Fryske Akademy, Ljouwert, 2005.
 The Kashubian language in education in Poland, Mercator-Education Regional Dossiers, Fryske Akademy, Ljouwert, 2004.
 The Making of a Language. The Case of the Idiom of Wilamowice, Southern Poland, Mouton de Gruyter, Berlin-New York, 2003, 
 Klessa, Katarzyna & Tomasz Wicherkiewicz "Design and Implementation of an Online Database for Endangered Languages: Multilingual Heritage of Poland", in: F.A. Almeida i in. (red.) Input a Word, Analyze the World: Selected Approaches to Corpus Linguistics. Cambridge Scholars Publishing, 2016; 9-24.
 Hornsby, Michael & Tomasz Wicherkiewicz, "To Be or Not to Be (A Minority)? The Case of the Kashubians in Poland", in: I.Horváth & M.Tonk (red.) Minority politics within the Europe of regions. Scientia Kiadó, 2011; 141-153.
 "Becoming a regional language - a method in language status planning?", in: Actes del 2n Congrés Europeu sobre Planificació Lingüística. Generalitat de Catalunya, 2002; 473-476.
 Majewicz, Alfred F. & Tomasz Wicherkiewicz, "Minority Rights Abuse in Communist Poland and Inherited Issues", Acta Slavica Iaponica 16, 1998: 54-73.
 "The Sociolinguistic Situation of the German Minority in Poland". Rijksuniversiteit Groningen, 1995.

References

1967 births
Living people
Adam Mickiewicz University in Poznań alumni
Academic staff of Adam Mickiewicz University in Poznań
Linguists from Poland